John and Anna Vreeland House, also known as "The Hamilton House" is located in Clifton, Passaic County, New Jersey, United States. The house was built in 1817 by Anna and John Vreeland and is one of the last symbols of Dutch settlement in the City of Clifton and one of the finest examples of early 19th century stone houses in Passaic County. The ownership of the house changed hands several times until 1856 when Henry Hamilton purchased it. It remained in the possession of the Hamilton family until 1972 when it was acquired by the City of Clifton. The homestead was originally located about 1,000 feet north on the opposite side of Valley Road from the current location. In 1973 it was moved to save the buildings from being demolished. and was added to the National Register of Historic Places on May 13, 1982.

See also
National Register of Historic Places listings in Passaic County, New Jersey

References

Clifton, New Jersey
Houses on the National Register of Historic Places in New Jersey
Houses completed in 1817
Houses in Passaic County, New Jersey
National Register of Historic Places in Passaic County, New Jersey
Stone houses in New Jersey
New Jersey Register of Historic Places